Pseudovates peruviana, common name Peruvian stick mantis, is a medium-sized species of praying mantis endemic to Peru.

It takes its name from its slender, twig-like body, often dark brown in coloration, with two dark markings on its wings. Females can also have green forewings, mottled to mimic dying leaves."

This species, like many other mantids, can be kept as a pet.

See also
Stick mantis
List of mantis genera and species

References

Mantidae
Mantodea of South America